This is a list of translations of works by William Shakespeare.

See also
List of translators of William Shakespeare

External links
 Draft translations into Welsh by J. Alban Morris of Henry VIII, The Tempest, 'The Rape of Lucrece', 'A Lover's Complaint', 'The Passionate Pilgrim', 'The Phoenix and the Turtle' and the sonnets.
 Notes by J. Alban Morris for Welsh translations of The Merry Wives of Windsor, Macbeth, The Tempest etc.

Shakespeare-related lists
Shakespeare